Athanasios "Sakis" Platanitis (born 28 February 1974) is a retired Greek water polo player who played for Olympiacos. He won numerous titles with Olympiacos, including the 2002 LEN Champions League and the 2002 LEN European Super Cup. He is currently a coach at Olympiacos Water Polo Academy.

References

External links
 Sakis Platanitis, Olympiacos Water Polo Academy 

1974 births
Living people
Olympiacos Water Polo Club players
Greek male water polo players